Middle Swan is a suburb of Perth, Western Australia, and forms part of the City of Swan local government area. The suburb is bordered to the west by the Swan River. The suburb is most notable for its various wineries, including Nikola Estate that was once known as Houghton and Sandalford. It also has the Midland brickworks within its boundaries, as well as an accommodation facility (Swanleigh Residential College, which closed in 2010) for country students attending the Governor Stirling Senior High School and Swan Christian College.

Notable people from Middle Swan
 Simon Katich, Test cricketer
 William Mitchell, the first rector of the Swan Parish

References

 
Suburbs of Perth, Western Australia
Suburbs and localities in the City of Swan